Ochrosia thiollierei, synonym Neisosperma thiollierei, is a species of plant in the family Apocynaceae. It is endemic to New Caledonia. It is threatened by habitat loss.

References

Endemic flora of New Caledonia
thiollierei
Critically endangered plants
Taxonomy articles created by Polbot